Starlight is an early British television programme, one of the first regular series to be broadcast by the BBC Television Service during the 1930s. Its first edition was broadcast on 3 November 1936 – the day after the service had officially begun – and it continued to be broadcast until the suspension of television for the duration of the Second World War during 1939.
After the resumption of BBC television during 1946, Starlight was one of the few pre-war programmes to be reinstated, and it was broadcast for a further three years until 1949. 

A variety show, the programmes would feature comedians, singers, dancers and various other entertainment acts. One notable edition of the 1930s gave popular singer Gracie Fields her first ever television appearance.

As with all other BBC programmes of the time, Starlight was transmitted live from the studios at Alexandra Palace. The shows were not recorded, and no material other than still photographs exists for the series now.

References
Vahimagi, Tise. British Television: An Illustrated Guide. Oxford. Oxford University Press / British Film Institute. 1994. .

1936 British television series debuts
1949 British television series endings
1930s British television series
1940s British television series
BBC Television shows
Lost BBC episodes
1936 establishments in the United Kingdom
Black-and-white British television shows